The coat of arms of Charlottetown is the full armorial achievement as used by the municipal government as an official symbol.

The coat of arms is a simple white and green shield with the coronation crown of Queen Charlotte Sophia of England in the middle.

References

External links
Coat of Arms of Charlottetown

Charlottetown
Culture of Charlottetown
Charlottetown